This is a list of countries by diamond production, based on data reported by the Kimberley Process Certification Scheme.

2016

This is a list of countries by diamond production in 2016, based on the British Geological Survey Mineral Statistics Summary for 2016.

See also
List of countries by diamond exports
List of diamond mines

References 

Production
Diamond